Ade Suhendra may refer to :
Ade Suhendra (footballer born 1983), an Indonesian football midfielder
Ade Suhendra (footballer born 1987), an Indonesian football defender